SICP may refer to:

Structure and Interpretation of Computer Programs, an introductory computer programming book
St. Ignatius College Preparatory, Jesuit high school in San Francisco, California, U.S.
St. Ignatius College Preparatory School, Jesuit high school in Chicago, Illinois, U.S.